Tregaron railway station was a railway station in Wales on the former Carmarthen to Aberystwyth Line serving Tregaron, Ceredigion, Wales.

The Manchester and Milford Railway (M&MR) opened from Pencader to Aberystwyth on 12 August 1867. The line went into receivership from 1875 to 1900.

The Ordnance Survey maps show that the railway station was built with two platforms, a passing loop, a goods shed, goods yard sidings and signal box. The Great Western Railway took over the service in 1906, and fully absorbed the line in 1911. The Great Western Railway and the station passed on to British Railways on nationalisation in 1948. It was then closed by the British Railways Board.

Although proposed for closure in the Beeching Report serious damage due to flooding south of Aberystwyth closed that section in December 1964. The cost of repairs was deemed unjustified and led to the withdrawal of passenger services in February 1965, however milk trains continued to run from Carmarthen to nearby Pont Llanio until 1970.

Notes

References

External links 
 Coflein database entry for Pont Llanio railway station

Disused railway stations in Ceredigion
Railway stations in Great Britain opened in 1866
Railway stations in Great Britain closed in 1965
Former Great Western Railway stations
1866 establishments in Wales
Beeching closures in Wales
1965 disestablishments in Wales
Tregaron